So Dear to My Heart is a 1948 American live-action/animated film produced by Walt Disney and released by RKO Radio Pictures. Its world premiere was in Chicago, Illinois, on November 29, 1948. Like 1946's Song of the South, the film combines animation and live action. It is based on the 1943 Sterling North book Midnight and Jeremiah. The book was revised by North to parallel the film's storyline amendments and then re-issued under the same title as the film.

The film was a personal favorite of Walt Disney, since it re-created on film one of the most memorable times of his life, growing up on a small farm in the American Midwest at the turn of the twentieth century. Walt said: "So Dear was especially close to me. Why, that's the life my brother and I grew up with as kids out in Missouri." Walt had intended that this would be the first all live-action Disney feature film, but his distributor, RKO, convinced him that when audiences saw the word "Disney," they expected animation. Thus they split the difference.

So Dear to My Heart was the final film appearance of Harry Carey.

Plot

Set in Indiana in 1903, the film tells the tale of Jeremiah Kincaid (Bobby Driscoll) and his determination to raise a black-wool lamb that was once rejected by its mother. Jeremiah names the lamb Danny for the famed race horse Dan Patch (who is also portrayed in the film). Jeremiah's dream of showing Danny at the Pike County Fair must overcome the obstinate objections of his loving yet tough grandmother Granny (Beulah Bondi). Jeremiah's confidant Uncle Hiram (Burl Ives) is the boy's steady ally. Inspired by the animated figures and stories, the boy perseveres.

Cast
 Bobby Driscoll as Jeremiah "Jerry" Kincaid
 Luana Patten as Tildy
 Burl Ives as Uncle Hiram Douglas
 Beulah Bondi as Granny Kincaid
 Harry Carey as Head Judge at County Fair
 Raymond Bond as Pete Grundy, Storekeeper 
 Walter Soderling as Grampa Meeker
 Matt Willis as Mr. Burns, Horse Trainer
 Spelman B. Collins as Judge
 Bob Haymes as Singer Bob Haymes

Voices
 John Beal as Adult Jeremiah/Narrator
 Ken Carson as The Owl
 Bob Stanton as Danny
 Marion Darlington as Whistling Sound Effects
Clarence Nash as Vocal Sound Effects 
 The Rhythmaires as Vocal Ensemble/Bluebirds

Awards and honors
The film was nominated for the Academy Award for Best Original Song for Burl Ives's version of the 17th-century English folk song "Lavender Blue," but lost to "Baby, It's Cold Outside" from Neptune's Daughter.

Bobby Driscoll received a special Juvenile Award from the Academy, honoring him as "the outstanding juvenile actor of 1949".  (In addition to So Dear to My Heart, he had garnered critical acclaim for his dramatic performance in the RKO melodrama The Window.)

The film is recognized by American Film Institute in this list:
 2004: AFI's 100 Years...100 Songs:	
 "Lavender Blue" – Nominated

Production
The train depot in the film was later relocated to Ward Kimball's Grizzly Flats Railroad in his backyard. After the railroad closed, John Lasseter relocated it to the Justi Creek Railway.

Release
The film returned rentals to RKO by 1951 of $2,775,000 with $2,200,000 being generated in the U.S. and Canada.

The film was re-released in 1964 and earned an estimated $1.5 million in rentals in the U.S. and Canada.

So Dear to My Heart was released on home video in 1986. It was then re-released in 1992 and released on video in 1994 as part of the Walt Disney Masterpiece Collection. The film was originally planned for a US DVD release as part of the Walt Disney Gold Classic Collection, but was cancelled, with no particular reason given. Six years after seeing a region 2 DVD release, it was released in the US on DVD in July 2008 as a Disney Movie Club Exclusive.

See also
 1948 in film
 List of American films of 1948
 List of Walt Disney Pictures films
 List of films with live action and animation

References

External links
 
 
 
 So Dear to My Heart: The Secrets Behind the Film

Walt Disney Pictures films
1948 films
1940s English-language films
American comedy-drama films
1948 comedy-drama films
1948 musical films
Films based on children's books
Films set in 1903
Films set in Indiana
Films based on American novels
Films directed by Hamilton Luske
Films directed by Harold D. Schuster
1940s American animated films
Films produced by Walt Disney
Films produced by Perce Pearce
Films scored by Paul Smith (film and television composer)
American films with live action and animation
1940s children's animated films
Walt Disney Pictures animated films
Films with screenplays by Maurice Rapf